221 may refer to:

In time:
 The year:
221 AD
221 BC

In mathematics:

 221 (number)

In geography:
Roads:
U.S. Route 221 in Virginia

In transportation:
Aircraft:
The Boeing 221 mail plane

In weapons:
Firearms:
The .221 Remington Fireball pistol cartridge

In fiction:
221B Baker Street, the address of Sherlock Holmes
Experiment 221, the codename for Sparky, a fictional alien character in the Lilo & Stitch franchise

See also
 Two to One (1978 album), album by Thelma Houston